Jackson, full name Jackson Coelho Silva (born 23 March 1973), is a Brazilian former professional footballer. He played over 200 games in Campeonato Brasileiro Série A and capped for Brazil.

Biography
Born in Codó, Maranhão, north-eastern Brazil, Jackson started his career at Maranhão, which he played 3 times in national cup in 1994 and 1995 season. He made his Série A debut with Goiás in 1995 season. He moved to Sport Recife in 1997 season and started to become a regular starter. In 1999, he moved to Palmeiras and in 2000 moved to Cruzeiro. He was signed by Internacional in 2001. In 2002 season he represented Gama in Série A. In 2003, he played for Ituano in 2003 Copa do Brasil and moved to Coritiba at the start of 2003 Campeonato Brasileiro Série A. He joined United Arab Emirati team Emirates Club in January 2004. He returned to Ituano in mid-year, played 15 times in 2004 Série B and finished as the losing quarter-finalists (not to be confused with Jakson who left Ituano in mid-year).

In February 2005 he was re-signed by Coritiba but relegated to Série B in 2006 season. In 2007, he was signed by Vitória on free transfer, finished as the fourth of 2007 Série B and promoted. In 2010 season he joined Santa Cruz of Série D and in September moved to ABC of Série C, which both team also competed 2010 Campeonato do Nordeste (but Jackson was signed after the registration deadline). The team finished as the Série C winner and promoted to 2011 Série B. He signed a new 1-year contract on 10 January 2011.

Honours
 Copa Libertadores: 1999
 Copa do Brasil: 2000
 Campeonato Brasileiro Série C: 2010
 Torneio Rio-São Paulo: 2000
 Campeonato Baiano: 2007, 2008, 2009
 Campeonato Maranhense: 1993, 1994, 1995
 Campeonato Pernambucano: 1997, 1998
 Campeonato Potiguar: 2011

References

External links
 
 Futpedia 

Living people
1973 births
Sportspeople from Maranhão
Brazilian footballers
Brazil international footballers
Maranhão Atlético Clube players
Mogi Mirim Esporte Clube players
Goiás Esporte Clube players
Comercial Futebol Clube (Ribeirão Preto) players
Sport Club do Recife players
Sociedade Esportiva Palmeiras players
Cruzeiro Esporte Clube players
Sport Club Internacional players
Paulista Futebol Clube players
Sociedade Esportiva do Gama players
Ituano FC players
Coritiba Foot Ball Club players
Emirates Club players
Esporte Clube Vitória players
Santa Cruz Futebol Clube players
ABC Futebol Clube players
Association football midfielders
Brazilian expatriate footballers
Expatriate footballers in the United Arab Emirates
Brazilian expatriate sportspeople in the United Arab Emirates
UAE Pro League players